Ramateertham is a village panchayat in Nellimarla mandal of Vizianagaram district in Andhra Pradesh in India. It is about 12 km from Vizianagaram city. It is a famous Pilgrimage and also Ancient Historical Site since 3rd Century BCE. There is a post office at Ramateertham. The PIN code is 535218.

Archaeological Site 
Archaeological survey report  of 1903 describe it as:

Ramateertham is one of the places made sacred by a traditional connection with Lord Sree Rama. The temple and village at the base of a chain of hills of solid rock on which are some perennial springs of water, and various places each in a way associated with the name of Rama. The Jains have also had a residence here, their remains consisting chiefly of natural caves with slab sculptures set in them, and some small ruined brick temples. It is one of the few places in this direction where Jains remains exist. The only notice of buried remains here is in Sewel's Lists (Vol. I, page 15) where mention is made of great heaps of broken bricks and cut stones on a hill which is difficult of access. It was hitherto unknown that these remains were Buddhist. Since that time, excavations have been conducted and resulted in the unearthing of an extensive part of what has undoubtedly been a large and important Buddhist monastery.

Buddhism and Jainism
The Black Granite hills on which you can find the ruins of some Buddhist and Jain structures known as Bodhikonda. Apart from it there are two other hills by name Gurabaktakonda (Gurubhakthulakonda) and Ghani konda (also known as Durga Konda) on which you can find a 3rd-century BC Buddhist Monastic complex remains and rock-cut caves with Jain Tirthankara images on the walls of the caves.

Bodhikonda
At Ramateertham there are three lines of hills standing parallel east and west, and each separated from the other by a narrow valley. The southernmost is known as the Bodhikonda, and on it are the spots connected with Rama, and Jaina remains consisting of natural caves, rock art, images and a ruined Jain brick temple towards south west of the hill.

Durgakonda (Ghanikonda)
The northern hill is the Durgakonda, so named from an image of that goddess which stands in a natural cave at its western base. In front of this cave and on the rock above it are some mounds. They contain both Buddhist and Jaina remains.

Gurabaktakonda
The central hill is known as the Gurabaktakonda (Gurubhakthulakonda) and it is high up on its northern side that the ruined Buddhist monastery stands. The hill is formed of precipitous bare solid rock, rounded on the top and about 500 feet in height. Near its south summit, under a vertical wall of rock is a perennial spring, beside which are a ruined brick mound and some Jaina images. On the rooky summit are some brick mounds. On the north face of the hill at a height of about 400 feet from the base is a long irregular rooky platform 903 feet in length and averaging more than 100 feet in breadth. The hill above it extends throughout its whole length in a vertical wall of rook about 100 feet high. Natural irregularities in the northern face of the platform have been made up by retaining walls of stone masonry. Along the whole platform is a series of brick mounds which were covered with dense jungle.

The excavation so far as it has proceeded has resulted in the unearthing of the following buildings noted consecutively from west to east. The base of a brick stupa at the western extremity 65 feet in diameter, and a tank beside it which was doubtless kept filled with water from the perennial spring on the hill top. Adjoining it on the east is a detached mass of heaped rocks on the east summit of which stands a chaitya 55 feet in length. In its apse is a stone dagob in good preservation except a part of the dome. It contained the stone lid of a relic casket. On the north and south lower sides of the mass of rock are two rows of brick cells each terminated by a small stupa or dagoba. East from this again is a pillared hall 77 feet square with rows of massive stone piers all fallen or broken.

Two other large chaitya with walls still standing for a considerable height adjoin this on the east, and north of them on the outer face of the platform is a long row of cells and other buildings. The other mounds at the east extremity of the platform are as yet only partly explored. A stone statue of Buddha with the graceful flowing robes of the Amaravati sculptures is the only one of the kind as yet found. The chaityas are irregular in their orientation probably indicating different periods of construction on the hill.

Post Independence Excavations
Excavations by the Archaeological Survey of India yielded some more Remnants along these Ramateertham hills comprising Buddhist relics and Jaina Figures. This site is now under the maintenance of Archaeological Survey of India, Hyderabad circle.

Rama Temple 
The famous ancient temple of Ramachandra Swamy can be found here. The beautiful idols of Lord Ramachandra Swamy, Sita and Lakshmana in Silver kavachas can be seen at this temple. There is a beautiful lake in vicinity of the temple. One has to visit this temple for its serenity. The festivals of Sri Ramanavami and Vaikuntha Ekadasi are celebrated with pomp and fervour here. Every year Ramateertham GIripradarshana will be organized during Vaikuntha Ekadasi. You can see many tortoises with Vishnu Namams on their backs, roaming around in the temple. There is also a Rama Stambham installed by Pedda Jeeyar.

Rama Idol Beheaded

Srirama idol in Kodanda Rama temple at Bodi Konda is destroyed by some unidentified people. On December 29, 2020, the locals found that the Idol of Rama was beheaded.

Shiva Temple

Next to Rama temple, there is a Shiva temple constructed in 2007.  Goddess Shri Kamakshi in the Shiva temple is must see for everybody. There are a lot of religious activities which takes place in the Shiva temple for every full moon and during navaratri celebrations. Many devotees visit both the temples during important days. This place has lot of religious importance and is historical too.

Gallery

See also 
 Danavulapadu Jain temple

References 

http://asihyd.ap.nic.in/vizianagaram.html

Archaeological sites in Andhra Pradesh
Hindu temples in Vizianagaram district
Hindu holy cities
Hindu pilgrimage sites in India
Vaishnavism
Villages in Vizianagaram district
Rama temples
Buddhist caves in India
Buddhist sites in Andhra Pradesh
3rd-century BC Jain temples
Uttarandhra